K'wan Foye, also known simply as K'wan, is an American author of urban fiction.

According to Foye his first novel, Gangsta, was largely autobiographical. The book reached number 3 on the Essence magazine bestseller list.

K’wan has been featured in: Vibe, Pages, King, The Library Journal, Entertainment Weekly, The New York Press, and Time Magazine, to name a few.

K’wan was also the recipient of the 2012 and 13 Street Lit Book Award Medals (SLBAM) in adult fiction for Eviction Notice and Animal.

His credits also include featured commentary in the award winning Documentary Iceberg Slim: Portrait of a Pimp (produced by Ice-T) as well as a reoccurring guest role on TV-One’s Celebrity Crime Files.

K’wan currently resides in New Jersey where he is working on his next novel.

Bibliography
 Gangsta, Triple Crown Publications, 2002
 Road Dawgz, Triple Crown Publications, 2003
 Street Dreams, St. Martin's Press, 2004
 Hoodlum, St. Martin's Press, 2005
 Eve, St. Martin's Press, 2006
 Hood Rat, St. Martin's Press, 2006
 Still Hood, St. Martin's Press, 2007
 Gutter, St. Martin's Press, 2008
 Section 8, St. Martin's Press, 2009
 From Harlem with Love, 2010 Write 2 Eat Concepts
 The Leak, St. Martin's Press, 2010
 Welfare Wifeys, St. Martin's Press, 2010
 Eviction Notice, St. Martin's Press, 2011
 Gangland, 2011 Write 2 Eat Concepts
 Love & Gunplay, Write 2 Eat Concepts, 2012
 Animal, Cash Money Content 2012
 Wild Cherry, St. Martin's Press 2012
 Animal 2, Cash Money Content, 2013
 Animal 3: Revelations, Cash Money Content, 2014
 Animal IV: Last Rites, Write 2 Eat Concepts, 2015 
 Diamonds and Pearls, St. Martin's Griffin, 2016
 Animal 4.5, W2E Concepts, 2017
 The Diamond Empire St. Martin's 2017
 Hoodlum 2: The Good Son" 2017

References

External links
 Official website

21st-century American novelists
African-American novelists
American male novelists
People from Harlem
Writers from Manhattan
Living people
Year of birth missing (living people)
21st-century American male writers
Novelists from New York (state)
21st-century African-American writers
African-American male writers